The Other Man is a 2008 British-American psychological thriller film directed by Richard Eyre. It stars Liam Neeson and Antonio Banderas as competitors for a woman's (Laura Linney) love. Released in 2008, the film was a box office bomb, earning just over $1 million against its $15 million budget.

Plot
Lisa, from the United States, is a shoe designer, married for 25 years to Peter Ryman, a software CEO from Northern Ireland. They live in Cambridge, and Lisa frequently travels to Milan on business. Peter disapproves of their daughter Abigail's boyfriend, George, and Lisa makes an oblique attempt to discuss her and Peter's monogamy, which he dismisses.

After Lisa dies, Abigail gives Peter a note with the message “Lake Como” from inside one of her mother's shoes. Peter discovers a romantic voicemail on Lisa's cell phone and a similar email on her computer from “Ralph,” as well as a password-protected folder named “Love.” Convinced that Lisa was having an affair, Peter wrongly accuses her colleague of the same name of being her lover. He replies to the email, “The Lisa you loved is no longer here,” but Ralph continues to write, believing he is still communicating with Lisa. Peter accesses Lisa's folder with the password “Lake Como,” discovering intimate pictures of her in Milan with another man. He has an employee illegally trace Ralph's IP address, revealing his physical address in Milan.

Peter travels to Milan and follows the half-Spanish, half-English cosmopolitan Ralph Cortés, striking up a conversation with him at a chess café. Over several meetings, Ralph – unaware of Peter's true identity – explains his twelve-year-long affair with Lisa. Having fallen in love with her despite knowing she was married, Ralph believes Lisa will soon rekindle their relationship. Concerned about her father, Abigail finds Ralph's messages and calls Ralph on Lisa's phone, confirming the affair. She confronts Peter in Milan, realizing he has become dangerously obsessed. Fixated on revenge, Peter goes to Ralph's apartment and discovers he is not the wealthy man he appears, but an impoverished building superintendent. Preparing to kill Ralph, Peter changes his mind and leaves.

Posing as Lisa, Peter emails Ralph, asking him to meet her at Lake Como. Ralph excitedly informs Peter, who gives him money to throw Lisa a lavish dinner party in London to seal their relationship. Buying expensive new clothes, Ralph arrives at the Villa d'Este to reunite with Lisa, only to be met by Peter, who reveals that he was Lisa's husband and that she died of cancer. In flashbacks, as Peter and Abigail care for the dying Lisa, Peter asks her to write down the place where she was happiest; Lisa writes down “Lake Como” for Peter to find, and has Abigail hide the note in one of the shoes she was wearing when she first met Ralph. Admitting that his pretensions of wealth are a lie, Ralph explains that Lisa knew the truth and paid off his debts, declaring that she truly loved him, and Peter leaves.

Back home, Peter decides to attend the dinner Ralph has arranged to celebrate Lisa, and invites Abigail and George. With Lisa's friends and loved ones gathered, Peter swallows his anger at Ralph and gives a heartfelt toast to his wife's memory, reconciling with Abigail and finally welcoming George to their family. As Ralph starts a new life as a hospital orderly in London, Peter and Abigail – having finally found closure in Lisa's death – return home.

Cast 
 Liam Neeson as Peter Ryman
 Antonio Banderas as Ralph Cortés
 Laura Linney as Lisa Ryman
 Romola Garai as Abigail Ryman
 Pam Ferris as Vera
 Paterson Joseph as Ralph, Lisa's colleague
 Craig Parkinson as George
 Richard Graham as Eric
 Emma Fielding as Gail
 Amanda Drew as Joy
 Paul Ritter as Guy
 Joseph Long as Maître d'hôtel

Reception 
The Other Man received negative reviews from film critics. It currently holds a 15% rating on Rotten Tomatoes with the consensus: “Despite the best efforts of a talented cast, The Other Man is talky, witless and tension-free.” It was a box office bomb as well, earning just over $1 million against its $15 million budget.

External links 

2008 films
2000s mystery drama films
2008 romantic drama films
Adultery in films
American mystery drama films
American romantic drama films
British mystery drama films
British romantic drama films
2000s English-language films
Films about dysfunctional families
Films about grieving
Films about widowhood
Films based on short fiction
Films set in Cambridge
Films set in Milan
Films shot in England
Films shot in Spain
Films scored by Stephen Warbeck
Films based on works by German writers
2008 drama films
2000s American films
2000s British films